Didier Talpain is a French conductor and diplomat.

Diplomatic career
Talpain graduated from the Institut Commercial de Nancy and in political studies from the Institut d'études politiques de Strasbourg. He has primarily served in cultural exchange projects with the countries, such as Poland, he has been assigned.

Musical career
Talpain studied flute, bassoon and chamber music at the École Normale de Musique de Paris, and conducted at the Conservatoire National Supérieur de Musique et de Danse de Paris (CNSMDP) in Paris. In 1985 he won a Menuhin Foundation prize and in 1995 the prize from the Perrenoud Foundation.

Selected performances and discography
Talpain is noted for working with the Institut français to recover forgotten French operas.
 Offenbach Les Mesdames de la Halle - unrecorded
 Johann Nepomuk Hummel, Mathilde de Guise. Kristine Gailite, Philippe Do, Pierre-Yves Pruvot, Hjördis Thébault, Choir Alea, Solamente Naturali 2CD 2010
 Georges Bizet, Le Docteur Miracle 2010.
 Georges Bizet, Don Procopio, Opéra comique 2003
 J. C. Bach. ''Amadis de Gaule - (Ediciones Singulares, limited edition of 3000 copies, 2012)

References

1960 births
Musicians from Belfort
French male conductors (music)
French diplomats
Living people
21st-century French conductors (music)
21st-century French male musicians